The Jungfrau Region (German: Jungfrauregion) is a region of the Bernese Oberland, at the foot of the Bernese Alps. It consists of two valleys south of Interlaken: that of Grindelwald and that of Lauterbrunnen, both drained by the Lütschine.

The Jungfrau Region is named after the highest mountain in the area: the Jungfrau. It is also notably dominated by the Eiger and Mönch. It is a major tourist destination in Switzerland and the Alps, renowned for its mountains and lakes (in particular Lake Thun and Lake Brienz). Both valleys are served by several railways: the Bernese Oberland Railway, the Wengernalp Railway and the Jungfrau Railway. The region also includes numerous cable transports and other facilities.

Towns located within the Jungfrau Region
Grindelwald
Mürren
Lauterbrunnen
Interlaken
Unterseen
Wengen

There are also smaller towns, with the population not exceeding 30 people.

External links
Official Website

Regions of Switzerland
Bernese Oberland
Geography of the canton of Bern